Sayyid Nurullah ibn Sharif al-Mar'ashi al-Shustari, commonly known as Qazi Nurullah Shushtari (1549–1610), also known as Shahid-e-Salis (third martyr) was an eminent Shia faqih (jurist) and alim (scholar) of the Mughal period. He may also have served as the Qazi-ul-Quzaa during the reign of Akbar.

Life 
He was born in 1549 CE (956 AH) at Shushtar, in present-day Khuzestan, south of Iran. He belonged to the Marashi family in Amol. He moved from Mashhad to India, on 1 Shawwal 992/6 October 1584. Although according to some accounts, the year may have been 1587. He was an emissary of Akbar in Kashmir obtained the first census of the areas of Mughal Empire during Akbar's reign.

Death 
When Jahangir came to power his position within the court came under threat both from the enemies he had made while settling the disputes in Agra and Kashmir, and from Jahangir's own orthodox stance. Ultimately his own book Ahqaq-ul-haq was presented as evidence against him, he was declared a heretic and sentenced to death due to his religious beliefs. He was executed by flogging in Jumada II 1019/September 1610, at the age of 61.

There is a famous debate shedding light on his assassination in the book Peshawar Nights.

Legacy 

His tomb at Agra is under waqf deed of Dawood Nori Nasir Bagh. The deed states that a member from the family of Nasirul Millat would be patron of the Mazar. Shushtari wrote approximately fifty books and essays in Islamic sciences like kalam, jurisprudence and sirah. He is considered as one of the scholars who paved the way for the development of Shia Islam.

Works

He wrote many works in different disciplines. some of them are as follow:

Majalis al-muminin
Ihqaq Al Haq va Izahaq Al atil
Commentary on Quran
a glosses on Tahzib al Ahkam by Shaykh Tusi
Ilzam Al Naseb.

See also 
The Five Martyrs
Shahid Awwal
Shahid Thani
Shahid Salis
Shahid Rabay
Shahid Khamis
Shaykh Ahmad Sirhindi
Akbar
Jehangir
Nur Jahan

References

Further reading

External links 
  An Oriental Biographical Dictionary: Founded on material collected by Thomas William Beale New edition revised by Henry George Keene
  Proceedings of the Asiatic Society of Bengal
  Biography: Shaheed-e-Thalith Qazi Nurullah Shustari
  Biography:Qazi Nurullah Shustari -Jafariyanews

16th-century Muslim scholars of Islam
Shia scholars of Islam
Mazandarani people
Indian Shia Muslims
Indian people of Iranian descent
1549 births
1610 deaths
Iranian emigrants to the Mughal Empire
Mar'ashis